Iranolacerta zagrosica, also known commonly as the Zagros Mountains lacerta, is a species of lizard in the family Lacertidae. The species is endemic to Iran.

Geographic range
I. zagrosica occurs in the central Zagros Mountains in Esfahan and Lorestan Provinces, Iran.

Habitat

Sympatric species
I. zagrosica co-occurs with I. brandtii, which prefers horizontal gravel substrates as opposed to rocky slopes.

Description
I. zagrosica has a single postnasal plate, and ten ventral plate rows.

Reproduction
I. zagrosica is oviparous.

References

Further reading
Arnold EN, Arribas OJ, Carranza S (2007). "Systematics of the Palaearctic and Oriental lizard tribe Lacertini (Squamata: Lacertidae: Lacertinae), with descriptions of eight new genera". Zootaxa 1430: 1–86. (Iranolacerta zagrosica, new combination).
Rastegar-Pouyani N, Nilson G (1998). "A new species of Lacerta (Sauria: Lacertidae) from the Zagros mountains, Esfahan Province, West-Central Iran". Proceedings of the California Academy of Sciences 50 (10): 267277. (Lacerta zagrosica, new species).
Sindaco R, Jeremčenko VK (2008). The Reptiles of the Western Palearctic. 1. Annotated Checklist and Distributional Atlas of the Turtles, Crocodiles, Amphisbaenians and Lizards of Europe, North Africa, Middle East and Central Asia. (Monographs of the Societas Herpetologica Italica). Latina, Italy: Edizioni Belvedere. 580 pp. . (Lacerta zagrosica).

Iranolacerta
Reptiles of Iran
Endemic fauna of Iran
Reptiles described in 1998
Taxa named by Nasrullah Rastegar Pouyani
Taxa named by Göran Nilson